Barese dialect (natively) is an Italoromance dialect belonging to the southern intermediate group, spoken in the Apulia and  Basilicata regions of Italy. Considered to be a variant of Naples dialect. Influences include Messapian, Oscan, Greek, Old French, Franco-Provencal and Spanish, creating one of the most distinct Italian dialects both from phonetics and lexis point of view.

Region 

Assigning local dialects to strict geographical areas is often problematic. Regardless, the Bari dialect is used predominantly within the province of Bari in central Apulia, and in the province of Barletta-Andria-Trani. It is also spoken in the western part of the province of Taranto, in some towns in the western part of the province of Brindisi and in the north eastern part of the Basilicata region. In the north of the Apulian region, the province of Foggia, the Foggian dialect is spoken and may be seen as a variant of the Bari dialect, although significantly influenced by Neapolitan dialects, while in the city of Taranto the Tarantino dialect is spoken, which is quite similar to the Bari dialect.

In the Italian cinema of the Commedia all'Italiana, Barese has been made famous by actors such as Lino Banfi, Sergio Rubini, Gianni Ciardo, Dino Abbrescia, and Emilio Solfrizzi. There are also numerous films shot exclusively in Bari dialect: amongst the most notable is LaCapaGira which was admired by film critics at the Berlin International Film Festival. Many local theatre companies produce light comedy shows in dialect, often focusing on the comic linguistic opportunities presented by the millions who left the region during the 20th century in search of work in northern Italy and overseas.

Extracts
The Lord's Prayer
Attàne Nèste,
ca sta 'ngile,
sandificàte jè u nome tuje,
venghe à nú u Régne tuje,
sèmbe che lla volondà tóje,
come 'ngile acchessí 'ndèrre.
Annúscece josce u pane nèste de tutte le di,
é llívece à nnú le díbete nèste,
come nú le levàme à ll'alde,
é nnon z'inducénne à nnú 'ntendazióne,
ma líbberace d'o' male,
Amen.

The Hail Mary
Ave Maríe,
chiéne de gràzzie,
u Segnore jè cche tté.
Tu ssi benedétte 'nmènze à lle fémmene,
é benedétte jè u frutte
d'u vèndre tuje, Gesú.
Sanda Maríe, madre de Ddie,
prighe pe' nnú peccatóre,
josce é 'nd'à ll'ore de la morta nèste,
Amen.

The Salve Regina
Salve o' Reggine
matre de misericòrdie vita, dulgézze, spirànze nostre
salve, à tté recurràme, figghie d'Èva
à tté suspiràme, chiangénne,
'nd'à 'sta valle de lacreme, alló avvocàte
nostre chiamínde à nnú cche ll'ècchie tuje
misericordióse,
é ffamme vide dope 'stu esílie, Gesú,
u frutte bènedétte d'u séne tuje.
O clèmènde, bone
o dulge Vérgene Maríe.

The Angel of God
Àngele de Ddie
ca si u custòde mije,
allucíneme, custodísceme, tineme é
gguvèrneme
ca te venibbe date da lla piètà celèste,
Amen.

Orthography

Alphabet
The Barese alphabet comprises the following letters:
a b c d e f g h i j k l m n o p q r s t u v z

Accents
In Barese the use of the accents is obligatory:
acute accent, used when stressed vowels have a closed sound: é, í, ó, ú;
grave accent, used when stressed vowels have an open sound: à, è, ò;

The monosyllables do not need to be accented, with some notable exceptions, such as à (preposition), é (conjunction), mè (adverb), and some others.

Examples: 
Mo me n'i à scí! – Now I have to go!;
Quànte si sscéme – What an idiot you are;
Ué! - Hi!/Hello!;
 Ce ssi tè-tè! – You are an idiot! / You talk too much!
Ce ttremóne! – What a wanker! (similar to pirla in the dialect of Milan)

The accents are important and are often used to show the differences between words that are otherwise written in the same way, but which have different pronunciations.
Examples:
mé ("me": personal pronoun, complement, unstressed form) and mè ("(n)ever": time adverb);
nu ("a(n)": indefinite article, masculine singular) and nú ("we", personal pronoun, subject);
pésce ("fish") and pèsce ("worse");
ué ("hi", "hello") and uè ("you want").

Linguistic features

Within the Province of Bari and surroundings many dialects exist which, while similar to Bari dialect, have various vocal differences. For example, the expression Che c'è? in standard Italian, meaning "What's the matter?" or "What's up?" is variously produced as:
 Ci jè? in Barese;
 Ciobbà? in Andriese;
 Ce jè? in Bitettese;
 Ce d'è? in Grumese, Palese, Molfettese and Ruvese;
 Ce jèi? in Bitontino;
 Ce da? in Terlizzese;
 Ci jò? in Barlettano.

Meanwhile, the conjugation of verbs sees changes such as:

Essere ("to be" in standard Italian)

Essere ("to be" in Barese)

Fare ("to do" or "to make" in standard Italian)

Fare ("to do" or "to make" in Barese)

Avere ("to have" in standard Italian)

Avé ("to have" or "to have to" in Barese)

See also

 Tarantino dialect
 Neapolitan language
 Appendix:Barese Swadesh list

References

D'Amaro, Sergio. "Apulia"
Official page for La Capa Gira  at the Internet Movie Database

Dialects of Neapolitan
Bari
Languages of Apulia